PICC Property and Casualty Company Limited (PICC P&C) is the largest non-life insurance company in mainland China incorporated in 2003. It was one of the three main subsidiaries of the People's Insurance Company of China.

PICC P&C is principally engaged in the provision of property and casualty insurance products. It operates its insurance business through motor vehicle, commercial property, cargo, liability, accidental injury and health, agriculture, homeowners and credit.

History

Equity investments
PICC Property and Casualty acquired 19.99% stake of Hua Xia Bank from Deutsche Bank and other investors in 2015, subject to regulator approval.

PICC Property and Casualty also owned 8.615% stake of sister company PICC Life.

References

External links
  
 English front page of the official website 

Companies based in Beijing
Companies listed on the Hong Kong Stock Exchange
Insurance companies of China
Government-owned companies of China
Financial services companies established in 2003
Chinese brands
Government-owned insurance companies
People's Insurance Company of China
Financial services companies of China
2003 establishments in China
Companies established in 2003